Nordvärmlands FF is a Swedish football club located in Ambjörby in Torsby Municipality, Värmland County.

Background
Since their foundation Nordvärmlands FF has participated mainly in the middle and lower divisions of the Swedish football league system.  The club currently plays in Division 2 Norra Götaland which is the fourth tier of Swedish football. They play their home matches at the Nyvallen in Ambjörby. Their first team manager is Jonas Korpi.

Nordvärmlands FF are affiliated to Värmlands Fotbollförbund.

Recent history
In recent seasons Nordvärmlands FF have competed in the following divisions:
2022 – Division II, Norra Götaland
2021 – Division II, Norra Götaland
2020 – Division II, Norra Götaland
2019 – Division II, Norra Götaland
2018 – Division II, Norra Götaland
2017 – Division II, Norra Götaland
2016 – Division III, Västra Svealand
2015 – Division II, Norra Götaland
2014 – Division II, Norra Götaland
2013 – Division II, Norra Götaland
2012 – Division III, Västra Svealand
2011 – Division III, Västra Svealand
2010 – Division IV, Värmland
2009 – Division IV, Värmland
2008 – Division V, Värmland Norra
2007 – Division IV, Värmland
2006 – Division V, Värmland Norra

Current squad

Attendances

In recent seasons Nordvärmlands FF have had the following average attendances:

Footnotes

External links
 Nordvärmlands FF – Official website
 Nordvärmlands FF on Facebook

Sport in Värmland County
Football clubs in Värmland County
Association football clubs established in 2004
2004 establishments in Sweden